African Business is an African business magazine published by London-based IC Publications. The current editor is David Thomas.

History and profile
African Business was first published in January 1982. Anver Versi was the first editor of the magazine. Its headquarters are in London. The monthly magazine covers business events across Africa. Special reports discuss specific sectors and industries. As of 2012, the magazine had about 140,000 subscribers. The magazine is published in English and French editions.

The magazine organizes the annual "African Business Awards" event in collaboration with the Commonwealth Business Council. The 2011 event was held in London, England.

References

External links
 

1982 establishments in the United Kingdom
Business magazines published in the United Kingdom
Magazines established in 1982
Magazines published in London
Monthly magazines published in the United Kingdom
Bilingual magazines
Africa-focused media